Kelly Convirs-Fowler is an American politician. Since 2018, she has served in the Virginia House of Delegates, representing district 21. She was first elected in November 2017.

Fowler's legislative priorities include finding bipartisan solutions to improve coastal resiliency and prevent coastal flooding; fighting for a fair economy, good jobs, and a level playing field for working families; and expanding access to affordable healthcare and quality education regardless of sex, race, income, or background.

Fowler serves on the Privileges and Elections Committee and the Science and Technology Committee.

Early life and career
Kelly Convirs-Fowler was born and raised in Virginia Beach. She is of Filipino and Mexican descent. She graduated from Tallwood High School and Virginia Wesleyan College, where she majored in Psychology and Criminal Justice. Both schools are in Virginia Beach. After earning her Master’s degree in Education at the Old Dominion University, she began teaching at Lynnhaven Elementary. She left her job to begin a home renovation business with her husband. They specialize in serving military families.

Political career
Fowler ran to be a delegate in Virginia's 2017 election against incumbent Ron Villanueva. She won the election with 52.3% of the vote, and took office in January 2018. Fowler is of Filipina and Mexican heritage. She and Kathy Tran were the first Asian-American women to be elected to Virginia's House of Delegates.

Fowler ran for reelection in the 2019 election. She defeated Republican Shannon D.S. Kane with 54.5% of the vote.

Fowler ran for a third term in the 2021 election.  In one of the closest races in Virginia that year, she defeated Tanya Gould by 1% of the vote.

Fowler has introduced 29 bills in the House of Delegates since taking office in 2018. She has worked to pass Medicaid expansion in Virginia and a 5% pay raise for Virginia's teachers in 2018.

In 2019, Fowler was the Chief Co-Patron of two bills protecting renters and homeowners that were passed into law.

During the 2020 special session, Fowler abstained on HB5013 which was intended to end qualified immunity for law enforcement following the 2020 summer Black Lives Matter protests. Her abstention was due to her own husband, David Fowler, being a police officer which effectively killed the bill.

Legislative issues
Fowler has stated that her priorities for the 2020 legislative session are:
finding bipartisan solutions to improve coastal resiliency and prevent coastal flooding
fighting for a fair economy, good jobs, and a level playing field for working families
expanding access to affordable healthcare and quality education regardless of sex, race, income, or background

The Virginia Education Association Fund for Children and Public Education has endorsed her because she has consistently voted for legislation supporting public education.

Personal life
She is married to David Fowler, and they have three kids.  She came out as bisexual at a Pride event in Virginia Beach on June 26, 2022.

Electoral history 

! Year
!
! Subject
! Party
! Votes
! %
!
! Opponent
! Party
! Votes
! %
!
! Opponent
! Party
! Votes
! %
!
|-
!colspan=17|21st Virginia House of Delegates District
|-
|2017
||
| |Kelly Convirs-Fowler
| |Democratic
| |12,540
| |52.5
|
| |Ron Villanueva (inc)
| |Republican
| |11,309
| |47.3
|
|colspan=5|
|-
|2019
||
| |Kelly Convirs-Fowler (inc)
| |Democratic
| |12,402
| |54.5
|
| |Shannon Kane
| |Republican
| |10,300
| |45.3
|
|colspan=5|
|}

See also

 Virginia House of Delegates elections, 2017

References

Year of birth missing (living people)
Living people
21st-century American politicians
21st-century American women politicians
American politicians of Filipino descent
Asian-American people in Virginia politics
American politicians of Mexican descent
Democratic Party members of the Virginia House of Delegates
Old Dominion University alumni
People from Virginia Beach, Virginia
Virginia Wesleyan University alumni
Women state legislators in Virginia
Bisexual politicians
Bisexual women
LGBT state legislators in Virginia